EL, El or el may refer to:

Religion
 El (deity), a Semitic word for "God"

People
 EL (rapper) (born 1983), stage name of Elorm Adablah, a Ghanaian rapper and sound engineer
 El DeBarge, music artist
 El Franco Lee (1949–2016), American politician
 Ephrat Livni (born 1972), American street artist

Arts, entertainment, and media

Fictional entities
 El, a character from the manga series Shugo Chara! by Peach-Pit
 El, short for Eleven, a fictional character in the TV series Stranger Things
 El, family name of Kal-El (Superman) and his father Jor-El in Superman
E.L. Faldt, character in the road comedy film Road Trip

Literature
 Él, 1926 autobiographical novel by Mercedes Pinto 
 Él (visual novel), a 2000 Japanese adult visual novel

Music
 Él Records, an independent record label from the UK founded by Mike Alway
 Él (Lucero album), a 1982 album by Lucero
 "Él", Spanish song by Rubén Blades from Caminando (album)
 "Él" (Lucía song), the Spanish entry in the Eurovision Song Contest 1982, performed by Lucía

Other media
 Él (film), a 1953 film by Luis Buñuel based on the 1926 novel

Science and technology

Computing
 .el, a computer file extension used for Emacs Lisp source code
 Enciclopedia Libre Universal en Español, a spin-off project of the Spanish Wikipedia
 Erase Line (ANSI), an ANSI X3.64 escape sequence
 Unified Expression Language, a feature of the JavaServer Pages software technology

Other uses in science and technology
 El (crater), a crater on Ganymede
 Electroluminescence
 Electroluminescent display, a display made with electroluminescent material
 Electrum (El), an alloy of gold and silver
 Encephalitis lethargica, a neurological disease
 Equilibrium level, the height in the atmosphere at which a rising parcel of air reaches surrounding air of the same temperature
 NIST Engineering Laboratory, a NIST laboratory since 2010

Sport
 Eastern League (disambiguation), a Class AA League in Minor League Baseball
 Euroleague Basketball, highest level tier and most important professional club basketball competition in Europe
 UEFA Europa League, formerly the UEFA Cup, a competition for eligible European football clubs

Transportation
 Acura EL, an automobile
 EL,  Air Nippon's IATA code
 EL, Ellinair's IATA code
 EL, Erie Lackawanna Railway's reporting mark
 El, shortened name of elevated railway systems, such as the Chicago "L"
 El, one name of the elevated railway system on SEPTA, the Market-Frankford

Other uses
 The spelled-out version of the letter L in English
 El (Cyrillic) (Л, л), a letter of the Cyrillic alphabet
 Al- aka "El-", Arabic prefix meaning "the" (definite article in Arabic), used in many family names
 Estée Lauder Companies, American cosmetics manufacturer
 Party of the European Left, a political party
 Greece in (EU VAT identification EL)
 Greek language (ISO 639-1 language code EL)
 El, the number eleven in the duodecimal system

See also
 
 
 El, ancient Volga Finnic term for "state". See Mari El, Udmurt Elkun, Moxel (Mokshaland)
 Él (disambiguation)
 Ell (disambiguation)
 Elle (disambiguation)